This is a list of members of the third Western Cape Provincial Parliament, which was elected on 14 April 2004 and expired on 21 April 2009.

See also
 List of members of the 2nd Western Cape Provincial Parliament
 List of members of the 4th Western Cape Provincial Parliament

References
 

3rd
Lists of legislators by term
Lists of political office-holders in South Africa